Battle of La Rochelle  or Siege of La Rochelle may refer to:

 Siege of La Rochelle (1224) between the Capetians and the Plantagenets
 Battle of La Rochelle (1372) between the Castilians and the English in a naval battle off La Rochelle
 Battle of La Rochelle (1419) between the Castilians and a joint Flemish-Hanseatic fleet off La Rochelle
 Siege of La Rochelle (1572–1573) between the Huguenots and the Catholics during the Wars of Religion
 Siege of La Rochelle (1627–1628) between the Royalists and the Huguenots
 Allied siege of La Rochelle (1944–1945) between the Allies and the Germans during the Second World War

See also
 Blockade of La Rochelle (1621-1622)
 History of La Rochelle
 
 
 La Rochelle (disambiguation)
 Rochelle (disambiguation)
 :fr:Bataille de La Rochelle
 :fr:Siège de La Rochelle